Henry F. Hewes (born May 21, 1948) is an American real estate developer and perennial candidate. Throughout his career, he ran for Mayor of New York City and for the U.S. Senate as the nominee of the Right to Life Party. He served on the presidential campaigns of numerous Republican politicians.

In 2016 and in 2020, Hewes announced that he would run as a Democratic presidential candidate.

Early life and education
The son of Jane Fowle and theater critic Henry Hewes, Hewes studied at State University of New York and Hunter College. He was formerly a publisher before moving into consulting.

Political career
Hewes worked as a regional and state director for a number of presidential campaigns. He supported Pat Robertson, Pat Buchanan and George H. W. Bush in their respective campaigns for president. After serving in administrative roles, he ran for mayor of New York City as the nominee of the Right to Life Party in 1989. He participated in the first mayoral debate, over the objections of Rudy Giuliani. During the debate he defended Democratic candidate David Dinkins against Giuliani, prompting allegations from the latter that Hewes and Dinkins were "running almost like a ticket here". He finished in third position in the election, behind Dinkins and Giuliani, winning roughly 1% of the vote. He also ran for U.S. Senate in 1994, receiving 2% of the vote and also finishing third behind Daniel Patrick Moynihan and Bernadette Castro.

In 2016, Hewes ran for president as a Democrat, receiving more than 600 votes in the Missouri primary and over 11,000 votes nationwide; in 2020, he again ran as a Democrat. He failed to secure the nomination during both years.

Political positions
In 2005, Hewes described his political stances as "eclectic", noting his opposition to the War in Iraq, the USA Patriot Act, and the death penalty. He also favored raising the minimum wage at the time. Earlier in his political career, in 1989, he supported the death penalty; as well as rent vouchers and the deregulation of the housing market in New York City.

Hewes is anti-abortion, stating in an interview that he was worried by the number of politicians that "are utterly untroubled by the 58 million aborted children since 1973." He also stated in the same interview with Rolling Stone that he is against any form of capital punishment.

According to Hewes, the financial system in the United States requires reform, along with the Veterans Administration. He believes veterans should receive full medical insurance.

References

External links

Politicians from New York City
American real estate businesspeople
1949 births
Living people
Candidates in the 2020 United States presidential election
New York (state) Republicans
New York (state) Democrats
American anti-abortion activists
20th-century American businesspeople
Candidates in the 2016 United States presidential election
Candidates in the 1994 United States elections